Newport Creek is a tributary of the Susquehanna River in Luzerne County, Pennsylvania, in the United States. Named tributaries of the creek include South Branch Newport Creek. The entire watershed of Newport Creek is considered by the Pennsylvania Department of Environmental Protection to be impaired.

Course
Newport Creek begins in the community of Glen Lyon. It flows in an east-northeast direction into Luzerne County, not far from some strip mines. The creek parallels the Delaware and Hudson Railroad for some distance before turning north and then northeast to follow the railroad. The creek gets much closer to the strip mines at this point. It continues east, out of Newport Township and into the community of Nanticoke, where the tributary South Branch Newport Creek flows into Newport Creek. Newport Creek then flows through Nanticoke, passing a mountain known as Honey Pot.  At this point, the creek turns north and reaches its confluence with the Susquehanna River.

Tributaries
There are several major tributaries of Newport Creek, including South Branch Newport Creek. South Branch Newport Creek's headwaters are in an area of wetland between Penobscot Mountain and Little Wilkes-Barre Mountain. Other tributaries include UNT 28347, UNT 64681, UNT 28345, and UNT 28346. South Branch Newport Creek also has a tributary known as Reservoir Creek. Middle Branch Newport Creek is also a tributary of Newport Creek, as is North Branch Newport Creek, which has no tributaries.

Hydrology
Most ( per day) came from North Branch Newport Creek.

The concentration of dissolved oxygen at the headwaters of Newport Creek ranges from 4.7 to 110.0 milligrams per liter. The pH in this location ranges from 5.8 to 7.6 and the concentration of alkalinity ranges from 2 to 25 milligrams per liter. The concentration of sulfates ranges from 6.4 to 24 milligrams per liter. The sulfate concentration in the waters of the Newport Creek watershed was 340 parts per million in 1974.

Upstream of South Branch Newport Creek, the discharge of Newport Creek ranges from 0.175 to 8.2 cubic feet per second, with an average of 1.8 cubic feet per second. The 25th percentile is 0.7 cubic feet per second, the 50th percentile is 2.0 cubic feet per second, and the 75th percentile is 3.9 cubic feet per second. Downstream of South Branch Newport Creek, the discharge ranges from 0.428 to 71 cubic feet per second, with an average of 5.6 cubic feet per second. The 25th percentile is 1.6 cubic feet per second, the 50th percentile is 3.0 cubic feet per second, and the 75th percentile is 5.3 cubic feet per second. Newport Creek was described as "a stream of moderate volume" in 1913.

Geology, geography, and climate
The watershed of Newport Creek is in the Allegheny Mountain section of the ridge and valley geological region. Little Wilkes-Barre Mountain is found in the southern part of the watershed. Most of the Newport Creek watershed is in the Coal Region. There are glaciofluvial deposits from the pleistocene epoch in parts of the watershed.

Nearly all (approximately 90%) of the Newport Creek watershed is occupied by interbedded sedimentary rock. The remaining 10% is occupied by sandstone. There are at least 12 coal seams in the watershed, which are all in the Llwellyn Formation. The coal has a lower-than-average sulfur content of 0.6 to 0.8 percent.

Some areas of quicksand have been observed in the Newport Creek watershed.

The main rock formations in the Newport Creek watershed are the Llwellyn Formation, the Pottsville Formation, the Pocono Formation, the Mauch Chunk Formation, and the Duncannon Member. The Llwellyn Formation occupies much of the northern part of the watershed, including much of Newport Creek itself and some of the South Branch Newport Creek watershed, except for the southern part. South of the Llwellyn Formation is a band of the Pottsville Formation. South of the Pottsville Formation are larger areas of the Mauch Chunk Formation and the Pocono Formation. On the southern edge of the watershed is an area of the Duncannon Member.

The Udorthents-Urban Land-Volusia soil association  and the Lackawanna-Arnot-Morris soil association together occupy 95% of the watershed. The remaining 5% is occupied by the Wellsboro-Oquaga-Morris and the Chenango-Pope-Holly soil associations.

There are five major sources of acid mine drainage in the Newport Creek watershed. One of these is the Glen Lyon Borehole, which is located at the creek's headwaters. It has a discharge of 4.7 to 19 cubic feet per second.

On average,  of rainfall in the Newport Creek watershed per year.

Watershed
The watershed is bounded by the community of Nanticoke on the eastern side and the watershed of Black Creek.

Communities in the Newport Creek watershed include Alden, Glen Lyon, Nanticoke, Newport Center, Sheatown, and Wanamie. Pennsylvania State Route 3002 and a number of township roads are found in the watershed. The creek drains much of a coal sheet known as Sheet No. 2. Its tributaries drain part of the coal sheet Mine Sheet No. 1.

Much of the Newport Creek watershed is forested. However, there are significant areas of developed land in the eastern part of the watershed. Other land uses in the watershed area agricultural and disturbed land.

The headwaters of the Newport Creek watershed are on Penobscot Mountain and Little Wilkes-Barre Mountain. Newport Lake, a  lake of mine drainage, is in the creek's watershed. Fairchild Pond and the Wanamie Reservoir are also present in the sub-watershed of South Branch Newport Creek. Najaka Pond and Kielar Lake used to drain into Newport Creek or its tributaries, but mining in the watershed has intercepted their discharge.

History
The Bloomery Forge was built on Newport Creek some time before January 1777 by Nathaniel Chapman, Joseph Beach, and Chris Alden. A stone bridge was once built over Newport Creek near the location of an old mill. A person named Chapman constructed a mill on the creek, which was eventually replaced one built by William Jackson. For a number of years, Jackson's mill was the only mill in Newport Township.

Coal mining began in the Newport Creek watershed in the middle of the 1800s, with deep mines being established in this period. A mine disaster occurred on the creek near Nanticoke on November 18, 1885. The mines were most active in the 1920s and in 1924, 35 million tons were produced. The production rate dropped slightly after the 1920s and entered a steady decline in the 1950s. Strip mines were established in the watershed in the middle of the 1900s. Deep mining in the watershed ended in the 1950s, but strip mining continues in the 21st century. Much of the watershed has been mined.

Biology
Coliform bacteria have been observed in the waters of Newport Creek.

See also
Shickshinny Creek
Solomon Creek
List of rivers of Pennsylvania

Notes

References

Rivers of Luzerne County, Pennsylvania
Tributaries of the Susquehanna River
Rivers of Pennsylvania